Chromolaena frustrata called Cape Sable false thoroughwort, or Cape Sable thoroughwort, is a rare North American species of flowering shrub in the family Asteraceae. It is found only in southern Florida, on the Florida Keys, inside Everglades National Park, and other nearby low-lying areas. It grows on coastal rock outcrops, the edges of hammocks, and other undisturbed sites at elevations less than 10 meters (33 feet) above sea level.

Chromolaena frustrata is a perennial herb rarely more than 25 cm (10 inches) tall. Flower heads are produced in groups of 2–6. The heads contain blue or lavender disc florets but no ray florets.

References

External links
 photo by Keith Bradley
 Atlas of Florida Vascular Plants

frustrata
Endemic flora of Florida
Plants described in 1911